Big City Secrets is the first studio album by American singer-songwriter Joseph Arthur, released by Real World Records on March 11, 1997.

Track listing

Personnel

Musicians
 Joseph Arthur – guitar (1–5, 7–9, 11, 12), vocals, harmonica (2), highly-strung bass (5), paintings, drawings
 Roger Beaujolais – vibes (1), Venetian xylophone (2)
 Martyn Barker – treated tubular kit (1), drums (2, 3, 5, 6, 10, 11), caxixi (4), bondage snare (8), live drums (9), scaffolphoneum (9), berimbau (11), cow gong (11), percussion (12)
 Simon Edwards – bass (1–5, 10, 11), piano (4), bass performance & arrangement (6), coal bass (7), additional guitar (7), string fossil bass (8), maze bass (9), sas (9), berimbau (11), mellotron (11), Persian fretless (11), filter bass (12), harmonic missiles (12)
 Markus Dravs – keyboard (1), desert storm & gravel percussion (1), corn horn (2), drum programming (4, 7, 9), lesley accordion (7), low drum & sheet percussion (8), production, mixing
 Brian Eno – backing vocals (2)
 Peter Gabriel – backing vocals (2)
 Nigel Eaton – hurdy gurdy (3)
 Ashley Slater – trombone (6, 7)
 Ron Aslan – drum loop (7)
 Nick Plytas – mellotron (7)

Technical personnel
 Ben Findlay – engineering, editing, mixing
 Ruadhri Cushnan – additional engineering
 Ray Martin – additional engineering
 Goetz Botzenhardt – additional engineering
 Ibi Tjani – additional engineering
 Jacquie Turner – additional engineering
 Nick Kirkland – additional engineering
 Justin Griffith – assistant engineering
 Lee Phillips – assistant engineering
 Lee Fitzgerald – assistant engineering
 Mark Aubury – assistant engineering
 Crispin Murray – additional editing
 Paul Morris – additional editing
 Tristan Manco – graphic design
 Derek Edwards – 2012 Real World Gold reissue repackaged album design
 Michele Turriani – front cover and right hand inside panel background photography
 Anna Gabriel – CD face and inside left hand panel background photography

References

Joseph Arthur albums
1997 debut albums
Real World Records albums